

References 

 Z